Sir Gerard Howe  KC (3 June 1899 – 25 May 1955) was a British lawyer and judge. He was Chief Justice of Hong Kong in the early 1950s.

Early life

Howe was born on 3 June 1899.  He was the son of Gerard Augustus Howe of Dublin and Nina, daughter of Henry Beasley, Monkstown, Dublin. He was educated at The Royal School, Armagh and Trinity College, Dublin. He served in the military during World War I and was mentioned in despatches. He qualified as a barrister at law at King's Inns in 1923. He married Margaret, daughter of Francis Maguire JP in 1927.

Legal appointments

Howe joined the Colonial Legal Service and was appointed resident magistrate in Kenya in 1930. He then served as Crown counsel in the Gold Coast (1934–1937) and Straits Settlements (1937–1941).

He was appointed Solicitor General in Nigeria in 1941 and then promoted to Attorney General in 1946. He was appointed a King's Counsel in 1946. He was knighted in 1949 whilst attorney general of Nigeria.

In 1950, he was appointed Chief Justice of Hong Kong replacing Sir Leslie Bertram Gibson.

Death

Howe fell ill in the summer of 1953 and in April 1954 returned to his home in Bullough Castle, Dublin.

Howe died while still in office on 25 May 1955 in London.

On his death, the full court convened on 28 May 1955 to pay tribute to him.  A two-minute silence was also observed by Chief Magistrate Lo Hin Shing.

References

1899 births
1955 deaths
British Hong Kong judges
British King's Counsel
Chief Justices of the Supreme Court of Hong Kong
Knights Bachelor
Attorneys General of Nigeria
People educated at The Royal School, Armagh
20th-century King's Counsel
British Kenya judges
Gold Coast (British colony) people
Straits Settlements people
Attorneys General of colonial Nigeria
Alumni of King's Inns
Colonial Legal Service officers